Syracuse High School may refer to:

Syracuse High School (Syracuse, Utah)
Syracuse High School (Syracuse, Kansas), unified high school for Hamilton County, Kansas, in Syracuse, Kansas
Syracuse High School (Syracuse, Nebraska), high school in Syracuse, Nebraska

See also
Syracuse City School District, a school district in Syracuse, New York
Cicero – North Syracuse High School, Cicero, New York
East Syracuse-Minoa High School, Manlius, New York
Syracuse Junior High School, Syracuse, Utah, in Davis School District
Syracuse Elementary School (disambiguation)